Ahmedbeyli (known as Telmankənd until 1999) is a village and municipality in the Saatly Rayon of Azerbaijan.

Population
It has a population of 1,347.

References

Populated places in Saatly District